Yuri Wichniakov (Russian: Юрий Вишняков) is a Russian oktavist singer known for his powerful lower register, and resonant low notes. He is the featured bass on the CD Basso Profondo From Old Russia. Wichniakov performs notes as low as E1. Several of the choir directors he has performed with have compared the timbre of his voice to that of an organ.

Together with Vladimir Miller and the late Vladimir Pasyoukov, Wichniakov is widely regarded as one of the most prominent basso profondo singers in the world. He has chanted with Vladimir Miller in several concerts dating back to 2005, and has also performed alongside Pasyukov.

Choirs performed with
Wichniakov has performed the All-Night Vigil of Rachmaninoff (Всенощное бдение) with the USSR Ministry of Culture Chamber Choir in 1986. He has performed most frequently with the Orthodox Male Singers choir, which is known worldwide for their musical repertoire which highlights the profondo singer. He has most recently performed with the St. Petersburg Chamber Choir. He was hired specifically for the difficult B1 required in no. 5 of the All-Night Vigil.

In December 2016 Wichniakov has performed in a recording of Rachmaninoff's All-Night Vigil with the Radio Choir of the German MDR radio station in Leipzig under the direction of the Estonian conductor Risto Joost. A live recording of this performance can be seen on the radio station's official youtube channel. The corresponding CD has been nominated for the International Classical Music Awards 2018.

Physical appearance
Wichniakov is an archetypal basso profondo with an imposing presence. He is rarely seen without a thick beard, and on occasion performs in an all black cassock. His career has spanned over 30 years.

Discography

See also
 Basso profondo
 Russian Orthodox chant

References

External links
 https://www.oktavism.com/wichniakov
 http://thebassoprofondoblog.blogspot.com/2010/05/yuri-vishnyakov.html
 The Orthodox Singers Male Choir's Website
 Basso Profondo From Old Russia album on The Orthodox Singers Male Choir's official homepage: http://www.precentor.ru/s_g/e_4.html
 https://web.archive.org/web/20081204134220/http://www.andante.com/article/article.cfm?id=15515
 Wichniakov performing in Rachmaninov's All-Night Vigil with the MDR Rundfunkchor in Leipzig, conducted by Risto Joost, 02 December 2016
 Interview with Yuri Wichniakov by Alexander Mayang on youtube: https://www.youtube.com/watch?v=GTzOgyqKgf0

Russian basses
Living people
Year of birth missing (living people)